Children of the Revolution (German: Kinder der Revolution) is a 1923 German silent film directed by Hans Theyer and starring Carl Heinz Fischer, Oscar Beregi and Albert von Kersten.

The film's sets were designed by the art director Hans Rouc. It was shot at the Sievering Studios in Vienna.

Cast
 Carl Heinz Fischer
 Oscar Beregi
 Albert von Kersten
 Artur Ranzenhofer
 Annemarie Schartmüller
 Grete Wegscheid
 Renati Renee
 Franz Herterich

References

Bibliography
 Paolo Caneppele & Günter Krenn. Elektrische Schatten. Filmarchiv Austria, 1999.

External links

1923 films
Austrian silent feature films
Films directed by Hans Theyer
Austrian black-and-white films
Films shot at Sievering Studios